These are tables of congressional delegations from Missouri to the United States House of Representatives and the United States Senate.

The current dean of the Missouri delegation is Representative Sam Graves (R), having served in Congress since 2001.

U.S. House of Representatives

Current members 
List of members, their terms in office, district boundaries, and the district political ratings according to the CPVI. The delegation has 8 members: 6 Republicans and 2 Democrats.

Delegates from Missouri Territory
On June 4, 1812, the Missouri Territory was created following the creation of the state of Louisiana. The Arkansas Territory was spun off in 1819. The state of Missouri was separated in 1821 and the remaining land was annexed by the Michigan Territory in 1834.

After statehood

1821–1853

1857–1863

1863–1873

1873–1883

1883–1933

1933–1953

1953–1983

1983–2013

2013–present

United States Senate

Key

See also

List of United States congressional districts
Missouri's congressional districts
Political party strength in Missouri

References 

 
 
Missouri
Politics of Missouri
Congressional delegations